Brit Awards 2017 was held on 22 February 2017 and was the 37th edition of the British Phonographic Industry's annual pop music awards. The awards ceremony were held at The O2 Arena in London. Emma Willis hosted The Brits Are Coming, the launch show to reveal this year's nominees which was broadcast live for the first time, on 14 January 2017. Robbie Williams was given the Brits Icon Award the previous November during a special concert held in his honour at Troxy in London. Architect Dame Zaha Hadid designed the Brit Award statuette that was to be given to the winners.

On 13 January 2017, it was confirmed that YouTube star Caspar Lee would be the BRITs Digital Presenter. Singer Michael Bublé was set to host but later pulled out on 18 January 2017 due to his son battling liver cancer and is "determined to focus on his son's recovery". On 31 January 2017, it was confirmed that Dermot O'Leary and Emma Willis would present the ceremony, replacing Bublé. Alice Levine, Clara Amfo and Laura Jackson covered the goss from Red Carpet and Backstage on ITV2.

The ceremony included a tribute to the late George Michael, which was presented by former Wham! member Andrew Ridgeley alongside associated duo members Helen "Pepsi" DeMacque and Shirlie Holliman.
The lead vocalist of Coldplay, Chris Martin, sang "A Different Corner" in the tribute.

Performances

Pre-ceremony

Main show

Winners and nominees
The nominations were revealed on 14 January 2017.

1 Liam Payne accept this award for British Video of the Year.

Multiple nominations and awards

Brit Awards 2017 album

The Brit Awards 2017 is a compilation and box set which includes the "63 biggest tracks from the past year". The box set has three discs with a total of sixty-three songs by various artists.

Track listing

CD 1

CD 2

CD 3

Weekly charts

References

External links
Brit Awards 2017 at Brits.co.uk

Brit
BRIT awards
Brit
Brit Awards
Brit Awards
February 2017 events in the United Kingdom